The 1975 NCAA Division I Men's Cross Country Championships were the 37th annual cross country meet to determine the team and individual national champions of NCAA Division I men's collegiate cross country running in the United States. Held on November 24, 1975, the meet was hosted by Penn State University at the Penn State Golf Courses in State College, Pennsylvania. The distance for this race was 6 miles (9.7 kilometers). This was the final national meet at this distance.

All Division I members were eligible to qualify for the meet. In total, 32 teams and 268 individual runners contested this championship.

The team national championship was won by the UTEP Miners, their second title. The individual championship was won by Craig Virgin, from Illinois, with a time of 28:23.30.

Men's title
Distance: 6 miles (9.7 kilometers)

Team Result (Top 10)

See also
NCAA Men's Division II Cross Country Championship 
NCAA Men's Division III Cross Country Championship

References
 

NCAA Cross Country Championships
NCAA Division I Cross Country Championships
NCAA Division I Cross Country Championships
NCAA Division I Cross Country Championships
Sports in State College, Pennsylvania
Track and field in Pennsylvania
Pennsylvania State University